Martin Scott (born 7 January 1968) is an English former football player and coach. Scott made over 350 Football League appearances as a left back during the 1980s and 1990s.

Playing career
Scott had a distinguished playing career at Rotherham United, Nottingham Forest, Bristol City and Sunderland before injury forced him to retire from playing.

Coaching career

Hartlepool United
He went on to become youth team manager at Hartlepool United. He led the team to the fifth round of the FA Youth Cup, losing to Manchester United. Later, he had an eight-month spell as manager of the first team, he left the club after an alarming slide down the table, his side would be eventually relegated. He also enjoyed a spell as assistant manager at League Two side Bury.

Middlesbrough
Scott joined Middlesbrough as an under-18 coach in July 2007, before being promoted to reserve team coach a year later.

Scott had his contract terminated on 3 May 2010, along with goalkeeping coach Stephen Pears and first team coach Colin Cooper.

Barnsley
When Barnsley sacked manager Keith Hill on 29 December 2012, following a defeat by Blackburn Rovers Scott was asked to help out caretaker manager David Flitcroft. The arrangement came about after Scott texted to his friend to express his condolences over the managerial dismissal. Former Fleetwood Town manager Mickey Mellon also came in to help Flitcroft in similar circumstances.

On 13 January 2013, the day after Barnsley won 2–0 at home to Leeds United, Flitcroft was named permanent manager with Mellon as his assistant and Scott as first-team coach.

Personal life
Scott's son Olly is also a footballer who currently plays for King's Lynn Town.

References

External links

1968 births
Living people
Association football fullbacks
English footballers
English football managers
Premier League players
Rotherham United F.C. players
Nottingham Forest F.C. players
Bristol City F.C. players
Sunderland A.F.C. players
Gateshead F.C. players
Bury F.C. non-playing staff
Hartlepool United F.C. non-playing staff
Hartlepool United F.C. managers
Middlesbrough F.C. non-playing staff